Can You Hear Me? is a 2020 Sri Lankan thriller teledrama broadcast on Jathika Rupavahini. The series is directed and written by Sunil Costa. It is produced by Chinthaka Kulathunga and music direction is by award winning musician Dinesh Subasinghe. The series is the first ever attempt to take Sri Lankan teledrama to international audience via social media where it is airing with English subtitles.

According to the director, the series consist with three seasons. The first season started on 5 October 2020 and aired on every weekday from Monday to Thursday from 9:00pm to 9.30pm. The 51st and the final episode of the season was aired on 31 December 2021. The series stars Dulan Manjula Liyanage, Roger Seneviratne, Dilhani Ekanayake, Michelle Dilhara, Shalani Tharaka, Ananda Kumara Unnehe and Other characters.

The serial has been shot in and around the locations of Haputale, Bandarawela and Nuwara Eliya areas. The serial received positive reviews from critics. During the visit to Bandarawela to complete the final episodes, their work was suddenly stopped by health authorities in the area as a complaint made by an unknown person. Even after the false news, all the members in the cast and the crew were sent on self-quarantine in the same hotel they were lodged at and PCR tests were conducted.

Plot
The series follows through several characters representing different social strata. The people who meet every day in day-to-day life, the series describes their black and white qualities.

Cast and characters

Critical response
The serial received positive acclaim from the viewers, where the first episode has been watched by 78,704 viewers within few hours of release.

References 

Sri Lankan television shows
2020 Sri Lankan television series debuts
Sri Lankan television series
Sri Lanka Rupavahini Corporation original programming